The Red Green Show is a Canadian sitcom. It premiered January 4, 1991 and ended April 7, 2006. It aired 300 episodes, 11 specials, and 1 film.

Season 1 (1991–92) 
Season one and two aired on CHCH-TV in Hamilton, Ontario, which aired Steve Smith's previous variety shows: Smith & Smith, Me & Max and The Comedy Mill (which aired in that order). Red Green was a recurring character on all three aforementioned shows.

Season 2 (1992–93) 
The only season Bill Smith (Rick Green) was also prominently shown as a lodge member along with the already existing "Adventures with Bill" segments.

Season 3 (1993–94) 
Season three aired on CFPL in London and YTV.

Season 4 (1994–95) 
 The show moved to the Global Television Network and was retitled "The New Red Green Show" starting with episode 73.

Season 5 (1995–96)

Season 6 (1996–97) 
Episode 144 was the last first-run episode to air on Global

Season 7 (1997) 
 The show moved to the Canadian Broadcasting Corporation starting with episode 145.

Season 8 (1998) 
 Retitled "The Red Green Show" starting with episode 162.

Season 9 (1999) 
Primary star Harold Green (Patrick McKenna) saw reduced screen time this season. In the story he got a job in the city. Red would briefly visit him in his office from time to time.
Segments that Harold hosted prior, like the "Possum Lodge Word Game" and "The Experts" would now be hosted by either Mike Hamar, Dalton Humphrey or Winston Rothschild III. The show open, also emceed by Harold, would feature Red walking into the lodge with no announced intro for the rest of the series.
Bill Smith (Rick Green) would also leave the series for four years; the "Adventures with Bill" segment would ultimately continue with Walter (Joel Harris) and/or with Mike, Dalton or Winston and was simply called "Adventures."

Season 10 (2000) 
Harold makes no onscreen appearances in this season.

Season 11 (2001) 
Harold Green returns to the series with episode 211, initially in a sporadic form.

Season 12 (2002)

Season 13 (2003) 
Bill Smith (Rick Green) returns to the show after four years, starting with episode 246.

Season 14 (2004)

Season 15 (2005–06)

References

Lists of sitcom episodes
Lists of Canadian television series episodes